A partial solar eclipse will occur on January 7, 2084. A solar eclipse occurs when the Moon passes between Earth and the Sun, thereby totally or partly obscuring the image of the Sun for a viewer on Earth. A partial solar eclipse occurs in the polar regions of the Earth when the center of the Moon's shadow misses the Earth.

Related eclipses

Solar eclipses 2083–2087

References

External links 

2084 1 7
2084 1 7
2084 in science